Russia participated in the Junior Eurovision Song Contest 2007 in Rotterdam, Netherlands. The Russian entry was selected through a national final, organised by Russian broadcaster All-Russia State Television and Radio Company (VGTRK). The final was held on 3 June 2007. Alexandra Golovchenko and her song 'Otlichnitsa' won the national final.

Before Junior Eurovision

National Final 
On 7 April 2007, VGTRK announced that a national final would be held to select Russia' entry for the Junior Eurovision Song Contest 2007. A submission period for interested artists was opened and lasted until 8 May 2007. A professional jury selected twenty artists and songs from the applicants to proceed to the televised national final.

The selected artists and songs competed at the national final which took place on 3 June 2007 at the "Rossiya" concert hall in Moscow, hosted by Oksana Fedorova. The winner was determined exclusively by public televoting. The members of the backup jury were Nadezhda Babkina, Philipp Kirkorov, Grigory Gladkov, Yevgeny Krylatov and Larisa Rubalskaya.

In addition to the performances from the competitors, the show featured guest performances by Tolmachevy Sisters.

At Junior Eurovision 
During the allocation draw on 29 October 2007, Russia was drawn to perform 6th, following Portugal and preceding Romania. Russia placed 6th, scoring 106 points.

Alexandra Golovchenko was joined on stage by four boys: Roman, Dmitry, Lev and future Olympic gymnast Artur Dalaloyan.

In Russia, show were broadcast on Russia-1 with commentary by Olga Shelest. The Russian spokesperson revealing the result of the Russian vote was Marina Knyazeva.

Voting

Notes

References

Junior Eurovision Song Contest
Russia
2007